Regulator of G-protein signaling 3 is a protein that in humans is encoded by the RGS3 gene.

This gene encodes a member of the regulator of G-protein signaling (RGS) family. This protein is a GTP-ase activating protein which inhibits G-protein mediated signal transduction. The protein is largely cytosolic, but G-protein activation leads to translocation of this protein to the plasma membrane. A nuclear form of this protein has also been described, but its sequence has not been identified. Multiple alternatively spliced transcript variants have been described for this gene but the full-length nature of some transcripts is not yet known.

References

Further reading